Chechen mujahideen in Syria are ethnic Chechen members of Sunni Islamist armed groups. They are organized into military factions, and take part in the civil war in Syria to fight against the government of Bashar al-Assad on the side of the Syrian opposition and Tahrir al-Sham, also on the side of the Islamic State.

History 
The first mention of armed groups of Chechen militants in Syria appeared in a number of media outlets at the end of 2011. In October 2012, some publications wrote that Chechens as part of the Syrian opposition forces of the FSA and Jabhat al-Nusra took part in an attack on the military base of the Syrian army air defense brigade near Aleppo.

Chechen jihadists began arriving in Syria en masse mainly in 2011-2015 from Chechnya, as well as from Europe, where they left during the second Chechen War, fleeing from the war, as well as from the Pankisi Gorge of Georgia, where ethnic Chechens-Kistins who emigrated there during the Caucasian War live.

Chechens occupied the second largest number among the foreign contingent of jihadists in Syria, estimates of their number range from 1,700 to 3,000 people, they played a significant role in the civil war in Syria, and several dozen well-known commanders of Syrian rebels and jihadists were Chechens by origin. Some of them were veterans of the first and second Chechen wars and used their combat experience to train and train the Syrian opposition and militants. They formed their own armed detachments and jamaats, which were also joined by other militants from the North Caucasus, as well as Syrians and jihadists from all over the Middle East.

According to representatives of the Chechen diaspora in Europe, hundreds of Chechens from Europe went to Syria to fight in the ranks of the Syrian opposition against the government army of Bashar al-Assad.

In June 2013, the leadership of the Chechen Republic officially recognized that up to 1,700 Chechen natives were howling in the Middle East region. In the same year, according to information disseminated by the militants' Internet resources, as well as in the Russian media, Rustam Gelaev, the son of the famous Chechen commander Ruslan (Khamzat) Gelaev, was killed in Syria. Rustam died fighting on the side of the Syrian opposition.

Split 
Chechens mediated in the settlement of the conflict between Jabhat al-Nusra (now — Hayat Tahrir al-Sham) and the Syrian opposition, on the one hand, and with ISIS, on the other. In early November 2014, the leadership of "Jaish al-Muhajirin wal-Ansar", represented by Salahuddin Shishani, met with the leadership of ISIS in their capital Raqqa and held talks on reconciliation of the two warring parties. However, the conversation with the leadership of ISIS ended in vain. In response to the proposal of the emir of "Jaish al-Muhajirin wal-Ansar" Salahuddin Shishani to stop the war between Sunni Muslims, in particular with Islamic Jamaats such as Jabhat al-Nusra, Ahrar al-Sham and others, the leadership of ISIS refused and stated that it would not stop fighting these groups, because it considers the emirs of these factions Kafirs and Murtads. After that, the leader of "Jaish al-Muhajirin wal-Ansar", Salahuddin Shishani, left Raqqa and returned to Idlib.

This conflict was also reflected among the Chechen Mujahideen in Syria, in particular among the Chechen emirs, who had previously acted in alliance with each other. Some of them defected to the ISIS and took leadership positions, while some remained on the side of Jabhat al-Nusra and the Syrian opposition.

The very history of the conflict between Jabhat al-Nusra and ISIS (at that time, the Islamic State of Iraq) begins at the end of 2013, when units of the Islamic State of Iraq (ISI) invaded Syria from the territory of Iraq during the most active phase of the civil war, when various jihadist groups and the Syrian opposition began to consistently seize cities from the government army of Bashar al-Assad. Al-Qaeda in Syria (Jabhat al-Nusra) together with the Ahrar al-Sham group played a significant role in the capture of the city of Raqqa in eastern Syria in March 2013. However, after the capture of Raqqa, the head of the Syrian wing of Al-Qaeda expressed his loyalty to the main leader of Al-Qaeda, Ayman al-Zawahiri, and did not recognize the Islamic State of Iraq and Sham (Syria) proclaimed by the leadership of the ISI in the territory controlled by Jabhat al-Nusra. After that, in February 2014, a large-scale war for spheres of influence in Syria began between the groups.

Commanders 
Supporters of the «Sunni opposition of Syria»
 Abu Abdurrahman Shishani
 Abdul-Malik Shishani 
 Abdul-Hakim Shishani
 Hamza Shishani
 Abu Al-Bara al-Kavkazi
 Muslim Abu Walid al Shishani
 Abu Turab Shishani
 Umar Shishani
 Tarkhan Gaziev
 Sayfullah Shishani
 Salahudin Shishani 
 Hayrullah Shishani
 Sayful-Islam Shishani
 Naib Shishani
 Mohannad Shishani
 Muhammad Shishani
 Al Bara Shishani 
 Al Bara Shishani
 Abu Bakr Shishani
 Halid Shishani
 Ali Shishani
 Abu Musa Shishani
 
ISIS supporters
 Abu Omar al-Shishani
 Abu Sayfullah Shishani
 Abu Said Shishani 
 Ahmad Shishani
 Abu Abdullah Shishani
 Al Bara Shishani
 Abu Ibrahim Shishani 
 Abu Umar Grozny
 Musa Abu Yusuf Shishani
 Hayrullah Shishani
 Abdullah Shishani
 Abu Hafs Shishani
 Adam Shishani
 Abdul-Halim Shishani
 Hattab Shishani
 Abdullah Abu Muhammad Shishani
 Abdul-Vahhab Shishani
 Muhammad Shishani
 Abu Hisham Shishani
 Abu Anas Shishani
 Abu Shamil Shishani
 Jundullah Shishani

Literature 
In English

 The Syrian Jihad : Al-Qaeda, the Islamic state and the evolution of an insurgency
 Cecire, Michael (2016). "Same sides of different coins: contrasting militant activisms between Georgian fighters in Syria and Ukraine". Caucasus Survey. Brill Deutschland GmbH. 4 (3): 282–295. . .
 Vera Mironova. From Freedom Fighters to Jihadists: Human Resources of Non-State Armed Groups. — Oxford University Press, 2019-05-20. — 345 с. — .
 The Syrian Jihad: Al-Qaeda, the Islamic State and the Evolution of an Insurgency
 Pokalova, Elena. Georgia, Terrorism, and Foreign Fighters
 Assessing Terrorism in the Caucasus and the Threat to the Homeland: Hearing

In Russian 

 Майкл Вайс, Хасан Хасан. Исламское государство: Армия террора. — Альпина Паблишер, 2015-11-03. — 346 с. — ISBN 978-5-9614-4068-3.
 Даша Никольсон. Иностранные боевики-террористы с Северного Кавказа: понимание влияния Исламского государства в этом регионе // Connections: The Quarterly Journal. — 2017. — Т. 16, вып. 4
 Манойло А.В. «Русская весна» в Сирии // Мировая политика. — 2015–04. — Т. 4, вып. 4. — С. 1–26. —  |

See also 
 Afghan mujahideen
 Bosnian mujahideen
 Kurdish Mujahideen
 Chechen Mujahideen
 Indian Mujahideen
 Mujahideen

References

External links 
 Chechensinsyria
 Ali ash-Shishani: “Like all Chechens in Syria, I miss Chechnya”
 Russia: Is Damascus’ Claim Of “1,700 Chechens” Fighting in Syria Correct?
 The end of Chechen jihadis in Syria
 Europe’s Chechen Foreign Fighters
 Syria: Motorcycle Mujahideen — Diary Of A Chechen Jihadi in Aleppo
 Chechen extremists aiding opposition fighters in Syria
 Chechen commander for Al Nusrah Front reported killed in fighting against Syrian forces
 The Chechens of Syria
 Chechnya’s Veteran Fighters Have Their Backs to the Wall
 Combat in Cities: The Chechen Experience in Syria
 HANNIBAL RISING: THE NEW LEADER OF THE JIHADIST PMC MALHAMA TACTICAL
 HTS Usir Pemimpin Jihad Chechnya Dari Idlib
 Chechen and north Caucasian militants in Syria - Atlantic Council
 Battle-Tested Chechens Drive Islamic State Gains
 The Impact of Chechen and North Caucasian Militants in Syria
 Q&A: Would ISIS Fighters Return to Georgia?

Jihadist groups
Syrian civil war
Pan-Islamism
Mujahideen